= Gether, Virginia =

Unincorporated community in Virginia, United States

Coordinates: 37°54′58″N 77°12′26″W

Gether is an unincorporated community in Caroline County, in the U.S. state of Virginia.
